Issac may refer to:

Given name
 Issac Amaldas, Indian boxer
 Issac Bailey, American writer
 Issac Blakeney (born 1992), American football wide receiver
 Issac Booth (born 1971), American football player
 Issac Ryan Brown (born 2005), American child actor and singer
 Issac Delgado (born 1962), Cuban-Spanish musician, and salsa performer
 Issac Honey (born 1993), Ghanaian footballer
 Issac Koga (1899–1982), Japanese electronics researcher/engineer
 Issac Luke (born 1987), New Zealand rugby league hooker
 Issac Osae (born 1993), Ghanaian footballer

Surname
 Osthatheos Issac (born 1976), Syriac Orthodox bishop
 Rod Issac (born 1989), American football cornerback

Places
 Issac, Dordogne, a commune in France.

See also
 Isaac (name)
 Isaac (disambiguation)